The Russian Federation competed at the 2008 Summer Olympics, held in Beijing, China, represented by the Russian Olympic Committee. Russia competed in all sports except baseball, field hockey, football, softball, and taekwondo. They ranked third in the medal table by golds (24) and overall (60). Russia also had 14 medals stripped for doping violations, the most of any nation at the 2008 Olympics.

Medalists

| width=78% align=left valign=top |

| width="22%" align="left" valign="top" |

Competitors

| width=78% align=left valign=top |

The following is the list of number of competitors participating in the Games:

| width=22% align=left valign=top |

Archery

Balzhinima Tsyrempilov and Bair Badënov earned men's qualifying places for Russia at the 2007 World Outdoor Target Championships, while Natalia Erdyniyeva and Miroslava Dagbaeva earned two spots for women. Andrey Abramov placed second at the European qualifying tournament, giving Russia a third spot in the men's individual competition and allowing the nation to field a men's team.

Men

Women

Athletics

Russia sent a team of 106 track and field athletes, 48 men and 58 women, to these games. On 31 July 2008, Yelena Soboleva, Tatyana Tomashova, Yuliya Fomenko, Darya Pishchalnikova, and Gulfiya Khanafeyeva were provisionally suspended by IAAF for doping offenses. Nine medals won by Russians in athletics at the 2008 Olympics were later stripped due to doping violations.

Men
Track & road events

Field events

Combined events – Decathlon

Women
Track & road events

Field events

Combined events – Heptathlon

* On 16 August 2016, the Russian women's 4 × 100 metres relay team was disqualified for doping. The Russian team members were stripped of their gold Olympic medals, as Yuliya Chermoshanskaya had her samples reanalyzed and tested positive for two prohibited substances.The IOC requested that the IAAF modify the results, and the medals were redistributed accordingly.

Badminton

Basketball

Russia qualified both its men's and women's basketball teams for the Olympic tournament when each took first place at their respective continental tournaments (EuroBasket 2007 and EuroBasket Women 2007). Of the four tournaments since Russia began competing separately, 2008 was the second appearance of the Russian men's team and the fourth of the women's team, which took bronze in 2004.

Men's tournament

Roster

Group play

Women's tournament

Roster

Group play

Quarterfinals

Semifinals

Bronze medal match

Boxing

Russia qualified eleven boxers for the Olympic boxing tournament, the maximum possible. Russia was the only nation to qualify a boxer in each weight class. Nine boxers qualified at the World Championships. Ayrapetyan qualified at the first European qualifying tournament. Balanov filled out the Russian team, earning a welterweight spot at the second European continental qualifying tournament.

Canoeing

Slalom

Sprint
Men

Women

Qualification Legend: QS = Qualify to semi-final; QF = Qualify directly to final

Cycling

Road
Alexandr Kolobnev finished fourth in the men's road race, but as Italian Davide Rebellin, who won the silver medal, was stripped of that medal for testing positive for CERA after the event, the possibility exists for Kolobnev's placing to be upgraded.

Men

Women

Track
Sprint

Pursuit

Keirin

Omnium

Mountain biking

Diving

Men

Women

Equestrian

Dressage

Eventing

Show jumping

Fencing

Men

Women

Gymnastics

Artistic 
Men
Team

* Only two gymnasts per country may advance to a final.

Individual finals

Women
Team

* Only two gymnasts per country may advance to a final.

Individual finals

Rhythmic

Trampoline

Handball

Men's tournament

Roster

Group play

Quarterfinal

Classification semifinal

5th–6th place

Women's tournament

Roster

Group play

Quarterfinal

Semifinal

Gold medal game

Final rank

Judo 

Men

Women

Modern pentathlon

Rowing 

Men

Women

Qualification Legend: FA=Final A (medal); FB=Final B (non-medal); FC=Final C (non-medal); FD=Final D (non-medal); FE=Final E (non-medal); FF=Final F (non-medal); SA/B=Semifinals A/B; SC/D=Semifinals C/D; SE/F=Semifinals E/F; QF=Quarterfinals; R=Repechage

Sailing 

Men

Women

Open

M = Medal race; EL = Eliminated – did not advance into the medal race; CAN = Race cancelled

Shooting 

Men

Women

Swimming 

Men

Women

Synchronized swimming

Table tennis 

Singles

Team

Tennis

Men

Women

Triathlon

Volleyball

Beach

Indoor
Russia qualified both a men's team and a women's team in the indoor tournaments. The men's team won all their group games but one, thereby advancing to the final round. There, they won the quarterfinal, lost the semifinal, and won the bronze medal game. The women's team won three games and lost two, and also advanced to the final round, where they lost the quarterfinal.

Men's tournament

Roster

Preliminary round

Quarterfinal

Semifinal

Bronze medal match

Women's tournament

Roster

Preliminary round

Quarterfinal

Water polo

Women's tournament

Roster

Group play

All times are China Standard Time (UTC+8).

Classification round (7th–8th place)

Weightlifting 

Men

Women

Wrestling 

Men's freestyle

Men's Greco-Roman

Women's freestyle

See also
 Russia at the 2008 Summer Paralympics

References

Nations at the 2008 Summer Olympics
2008
Summer Olympics